Ching-Ling Chang (born October 8, 1948) is a Taiwanese-American former professional tennis player.

Chang was the first player to win a Federation Cup match for Chinese Taipei (Taiwan), which she achieved in her only appearance for the side in 1972. The Taiwanese, debuting in the competition, came up against Norway in Johannesburg and Chang won her singles rubber over Ellen Grindvold. She now lives in Phoenix, Arizona.

References

External links
 
 

1948 births
Living people
Taiwanese female tennis players
Taiwanese emigrants to the United States